Do-Hum-Me (1825–1843) was the daughter of the chief of the Sauk Native American tribe.

In 1843, she accompanied her father in a trip east to Princeton, New Jersey for treaty negotiations.  While there, she met and fell in love with an Iowa tribe representative named Cow-Hick-Kee. They married and soon thereafter were employed by P. T. Barnum's American Museum in Manhattan, performing ceremonial Indian dances.
Do-Hum-Me was instantly very popular, but died at age 18, possibly of influenza.  Green-Wood Cemetery in Brooklyn donated a burial plot. She was buried in her wedding dress. In 2005 her monument was restored with the effort of Isaac Feliciano, whose wife Rosa perished in the 9/11 attacks at the World Trade Center.

External links

Sac and Fox people
1825 births
1843 deaths
Burials at Green-Wood Cemetery
19th-century Native Americans